Tampa International Airport  (known as Drew Field Municipal Airport until 1952) is an international airport  west of Downtown Tampa, in Hillsborough County, Florida, United States. The airport is publicly owned by Hillsborough County Aviation Authority (HCAA). The airport serves 93 non-stop destinations throughout North America, Central America, the Caribbean., and Europe across multiple carriers.

History

Flying boat
Tampa Bay is the birthplace of commercial airline service, when pioneer aviator Tony Jannus flew the inaugural flight of the St. Petersburg-Tampa Airboat Line on January 1, 1914, from St. Petersburg, to Tampa using a Benoist Flying Boat—the first scheduled commercial airline flight in the world using a heavier-than-air airplane.

Drew Field

It was named for local developer John H. Drew, who formerly owned the land on which the airport stood. The more popular Peter O. Knight Airport was opened on Davis Islands near Downtown Tampa in 1935, where both Eastern and National Airlines operated until 1946.

The United States Army Air Corps began negotiating for the use of Drew Field in 1939 during the buildup of military forces prior to World War II. In 1940, the City of Tampa leased Drew Field to the U.S. Government for 25 years, or until the end of the "national emergency." During the war, the United States Army Air Forces expanded and modernized the airport. The airfield was used by the Third Air Force and renamed it Drew Army Airfield. The Third Air Force used it as a training center by 120,000 combat air crews, primarily in bomber aircraft for the European and Pacific theaters, and also flew locally based antisubmarine patrols from the airfield until that mission was fully taken over by Naval Aviation assets of the U.S. Navy and U.S. Coast Guard. There was one mishap in 1943 that killed five fliers. Despite this, Drew Field set a safety record for the Third Air Force in 1945 after 100,000 flying hours had been completed over a period of 10 months without a fatal incident. The aircraft operated included the Boeing B-17 Flying Fortress, Douglas C-47 Skytrain, North American AT-6, North American B-25 Mitchell, and others.

After World War II, the Army Air Forces vacated the facility and Drew Field was returned to the City of Tampa. The Peter O. Knight Airport and Drew Field reversed roles as the main Tampa airport because Drew Field was greatly expanded by the United States Army Air Forces during the war years. Airlines (Eastern Air Lines and National Airlines) moved to Drew Field from Peter O. Knight Airport on Davis Island, which was too small to handle the Douglas DC-4, DC-6 and Lockheed Constellation prop-liners then coming on line in the mid-1940s. During this period, the airlines were housed in the former Drew AAF Base Operations building.

Tampa International Airport

Trans Canada Airlines international flights began in 1950 and Drew Field was renamed Tampa International Airport. The airport's second terminal opened in 1952 near the intersection of Columbus Drive and West Shore Blvd. The April 1957 Official Airline Guide shows 30 departures a day on Eastern Air Lines: nonstops to Chicago-Midway, Detroit (Willow Run), Cleveland, New York Idlewild (now JFK), Boston, seven nonstops to Atlanta and 18 within Florida. National Airlines had 26 departures, including seven nonstops beyond Florida to Houston Hobby, Havana, Washington National, New York/Idlewild and three to New Orleans. Trans-Eastern had 12 departures and Mackey had two DC-3s, none nonstop beyond Florida. Trans-Canada had thirteen nonstops a week to Toronto or Montreal.

The 1952 terminal, built for three airlines, was swamped after the Civil Aeronautics Board granted Capital, Delta, Northeast, Northwest and Trans World Airlines authority to fly from Tampa in the late 1950s. An annex was built east of the terminal for the new carriers. Turbine-powered flights began in 1959 on Eastern Air Lines' L-188 Electra; in 1960 National, Eastern and Delta Air Lines began jet flights with the Douglas DC-8 (Delta was first, with a Chicago nonstop in May or June). National DC-8 nonstops to Los Angeles and weekly Pan American jets to Mexico City (MIA-TPA-MID-MEX) started in 1961. The 1952 terminal was congested as larger jets replaced piston airliners and it was again expanded.

During the early 1960s, the aviation authority began planning a replacement terminal in an undeveloped site at the airport. Airport leaders chose the Landside/Airside design in 1965 after a study. Construction on the new terminal designed by Reynolds, Smith & Hills began in 1968 between the airport's parallel jet-capable runways. Prior to its opening on April 15, 1971, 60,000 people toured the new facility during a two-day open house. National Airlines Flight 36 from Los Angeles was the first to arrive at the terminal; after touching down at 05:26 A.M., the jet taxied to Airside E.

The graphics and signage system designed by Jane Davis Doggett used red for one group of airlines and blue for another. The red/blue color scheme began on the highway outside the airport and helped guide drivers to the proper dropoff areas for each airline, then continued to guide passengers through the airport itself and ultimately to their gate. The Tampa Airport was the first airport to use this sort of color-coded wayfinding signage system which was safer for drivers and required many fewer signs than highway engineers had originally budgeted for.

The logo, used since the new airport opened in 1971, represents the blue waters of Tampa Bay with a jetliner flying into the downtown Tampa sunset. It is known as the "Spirit of Flight". The jetliner was modeled after those once used for supersonic transport—at the time the logo was created in the 1970s, it was during an era when it was thought that supersonic aircraft would replace conventional jets as a mode of air travel.

In its early years, the 1971 terminal would also see large amounts of tourists heading to Walt Disney World, which also opened in 1971.  This was due to the fact that Orlando International Airport (known then as Orlando Jetport at McCoy) was much smaller at the time with a more limited capacity.  Shawnee Airlines offered connecting flights from Tampa to the now-defunct Walt Disney World Airport in the 1970s. Orlando International opened its current terminal in 1981 using the same well-received landside/airside layout as Tampa International Airport.

On July 15, 1972, the  air traffic control tower opened, the tallest in the United States at the time. The Host/Marriott Airport Hotel and its revolving rooftop restaurant opened in December 1973, with triple-paned windows and sound-proof guest rooms.

Northwest Airlines and National Airlines brought the jumbo jet to the airport late in 1971 with the introduction of the Boeing 747 and McDonnell Douglas DC-10. This was followed by the L-1011 Lockheed Tristar a year later by Eastern Air Lines. National Airlines began trans Atlantic DC-10 service to Amsterdam and Paris in 1977.

Recent history
During the following decades, the airport was expanded to handle more traffic and additional airlines. Airside B closed in 1991 following the demise of Eastern Air Lines. In 1996, Airsides C and D were remodeled, and the interiors of both satellites were refurbished. During this time, all the airlines from both facilities were housed in Airside E. Upon completion of the renovations, the airlines returned to their original locations, and Airside E was permanently closed. The Landside Terminal was also remodeled multiple times during the 1980s and 1990s.

Both Delta Air Lines and US Airways opened maintenance bases at the airport. Both bases closed during the air travel downturn following the attacks of September 11, 2001. Alabama-based Pemco World Air Services now occupies the former US Airways hangar performing MRO (maintenance, repair, overhaul) services for the Spirit Airlines and JetBlue A320 fleet. On April 1, 2010 a press release announced that a lease agreement was reached to allow Pemco to lease the second hangar formerly used by Delta Air Lines, where they perform Boeing 737 cargo conversions and modifications.

Phase I of the economy parking garage was completed in November 2005.
Phase II of the economy garage opened ahead of schedule in November 2005, bringing a total of 5,600 parking spaces.

On March 7, 2011, federal officials gave TPA the green light to begin charter flights to Cuba as an official entry/exit point.

In 2007 and 2008, Zagat Survey ranked TPA the Best Overall U.S. Airport, while placing it second-best overall in 2009 and 2010. In 2008 Condé Nast Traveler recognized TPA as the second-best airport in the world, just two tenths of a point behind the first-place winner. JD Power and Associates have also given TPA Airport consistently high customer-satisfaction ratings over the years. In November 2011, CNN ranked TPA sixth among ten of the world's most loved airports, being the only one on the list from the US. In 2016, it was named one of the Top 3 airports in the country by Condé Nast. In 2020 Airports Council International named TPA the best airport in North America for its size.

Facilities

Terminal

Tampa International Airport's Landside/Airside terminal was the first of its type in the world. There is a central Landside Terminal where baggage and ticketing functions take place. The Landside Terminal is surrounded by four Airside satellites where airliner embarkment and disembarkment occur. Each Airside is connected to the Landside Terminal via an elevated automated people mover (APM) system which employs 16 Bombardier Innovia APM 100 Shuttle Cars. TPA was the first airport in the world to deploy a fully automated, driver-free people mover system and is host to Bombardier Transportation's longest-running APM system. There are four active airsides (A, C, E, and F) with 59 gates. All were constructed after 1985 and all airsides include a food court and gift shop, as well as outdoor smoking patios. Airsides E and F contain duty-free shops in addition to the regular gift shops to serve passengers arriving or departing on international flights.

Airside A contains 16 gates.
Airside C contains 16 gates.
Airside E contains 13 gates.
Airside F contains 14 gates.

Runways 
It has three runways: 10/28 is 6,999 by 150 feet (2,133 × 46 m) with an Asphalt/concrete surface; 19L/1R is 8,300 by 150 feet (2,530 × 46 m) with an Asphalt/concrete surface; 19R/1L is 11,002 by 150 feet (3,353 × 46 m) with a concrete surface. On January 13, 2011 the runway designations changed due to a shift in the magnetic headings. 09/27 became 10/28, 18R/36L became 1L/19R, 18L/36R became 1R/19L.

Service building
When the airport opened its doors in 1971, the service building went into operation as well. It housed the very first communications center, police dispatch, employee cafeteria and maintenance locker rooms. The building is located across from the Red Baggage and Ticketing levels. It was primarily intended to house mechanical equipment such as the chiller plant and electrical transformers. Since then it has been expanded to two levels which was in the original design in 1968. Today it houses the original facilities with the addition of offices, rental car counters, badging and a receptionist desk. The police department/lost and found has a lobby on level two (ticketing level) for walk-in lost & found requests.

Ground transportation
On February 14, 2018, a new 2.6-million-square-foot Rental Car Center with space for 5,300 vehicles, was opened to the public. The new combined service and maintenance facility is located near the southern edge of airport property and is connected to the terminal via a new train called SkyConnect. Passengers on most domestic flights also have the ability to check their luggage inside the Rental Car Center. Rental car services were originally located adjacent to the Landside terminal, near the long-term-parking structure; however, relocation was necessary to accommodate more cars and rental car companies as the facilities were at or near capacity.

On the southwest end of the Rental Car Center is a canopy and platform that is used for both Hillsborough Area Regional Transit and Pinellas Suncoast Transit Authority bus services. The bus hub is accessible via a bank of elevators that connect directly to the Rental Car Center and is steps away from the SkyConnect station. With the upcoming 2nd phase of expansion at the airport, the intent is to expand upon the existing platform to eventually allow bus services from Pasco and perhaps even Hernando Counties to connect into the airport directly. The land immediately to the south of the Rental Car Center can also be configured for future light rail or commuter rail services if plans come to fruition.

Airlines and destinations

Passenger

Cargo

Statistics

Passenger traffic

Top airlines

Top domestic destinations

Accidents and incidents
 On March 9, 1943, five USAAF flight crew were killed when their Martin B-26 Marauder crashed on a flight from Avon Park Auxiliary Field to Eglin Field. The pilot attempted an emergency landing at Drew Field and overshot the runway. Two others on board the B-26 survived. This occurred one hour after a USAAF Douglas A-24 flying out of Drew Field crashed in Mullet Key near St. Petersburg, a bombing range at the time. The pilot ditched the airplane and lived, but the gunner bailed out and drowned.
 On August 5, 1969, a passenger on an Eastern Air Lines McDonnell Douglas DC-9 on Flight 379 from Charlotte was arrested upon arrival after he entered the cockpit en route and told the pilot, "Let's go to Cuba"; the pilot said there wasn't enough fuel so the passenger returned to his seat. The hijacker later claimed he "wanted to see if he had the nerve to simulate a hijacking" and did not want to actually go to Cuba.
 On September 25, 1973, a Rockwell 1121B Jet Commander (N200RC) owned by Continental Jet Corp. was damaged beyond repair in a hangar fire.
 On November 6, 1986, an Eastern Air Lines captain, George Baines, age 56, was flying in his private aircraft, a Piper PA-23 Apache, (registration N2185P) from his home to Tampa International Airport to catch a flight. Captain Baines was cleared for an instrument landing system approach to runway 36L (now 1L) with  visibility in dense fog. He was unable to land during his first approach and declared a missed approach and executed a go-around to try again. At the same time, a Pan American Boeing B-727 was proceeding southbound on taxiway W. When the captain of the Pan-Am 727 saw the Apache emerge from the dense fog directly in front of him, he turned to the right (west) in an attempt to avoid the impending collision. About two seconds later, the Apache's left engine struck the B-727 in the radome, which is a structural, weatherproof enclosure that protects a radar antenna. Two passengers and a flight attendant were injured after they evacuated the aircraft. The Apache was almost destroyed and the pilot, the sole occupant of the aircraft, was killed. The primary causes of this accident was determined by the NTSB to include the pilots decision to continue his approach below decision height when the visibility was below landing minimums and the adequacy of current Federal regulations that allow pilots operating under Part 91 to conduct approaches when the reported visibility is below published minimum visibility for land.
 On December 1, 1993, a Cessna 650 Citation III (N700RR) operated by Consolidated International Services Inc. was landing when it collided with a cement pad while taxiing back to the grass taxiway, collapsing the nose gear. The plane had just arrived from a 2 hour 15 minute flight from Morristown, New Jersey. The cause was determined to be the pilot's decision to leave the taxiway with improper wiring of the anti-skid system. The plane was later repaired.
 On April 2, 2017, an Air Canada Jetz Airbus A319-114 (C-GBHN) was struck while parked by a motor coach during pre-departure setup for Flight 7042 to Fort Lauderdale. Substantial damage occurred on the port side of the fuselage and the left outer flap track. No injuries occurred onboard; the flight was cancelled. The aircraft was later repaired.

See also
List of airports in the Tampa Bay Area

References

External links

 
 Drew Field Echoes, military newspaper for 1942–1945 when the airport was a military air field
 FAA Airport Diagram
 

1928 establishments in Florida
Airports established in 1928
Airports in Florida
Airports in the Tampa Bay area
Buildings and structures in Tampa, Florida
Transportation buildings and structures in Hillsborough County, Florida
Transportation in Tampa, Florida